Eugene Roy Rogers (February 17, 1924 – December 30, 2017) was an American competition swimmer who represented the United States at the 1948 Summer Olympics in London.  He swam for the gold medal-winning U.S. team in the preliminary heats of the men's 4×200-meter freestyle relay.  

At the US Olympic trials of the 1948 4x200-meter freestyle relay, several swimmers who had already qualified in other events slowed down in their heats or swam fast in the prelims and scratched themselves for the final to allow more swimmers to qualify for the US Olympic Team.  

Ultimately, coach Robert Kiphuth did hold a time trial shortly after the actual trials with eleven of the swimmers.  This time trial had Jimmy McLane as first overall with a time of 2:11.0, Bill Smith and Wally Wolf in 2:11.2, and Wally Ris in 2:12.4.  This quartet was used for the Olympic final.  The next four-Eugene Rogers in 2:14.2, Edwin Gilbert in 2:15.4, Robert Gibe in 2:15.6, and William Dudley in 2:15.9, were used in the Olympic prelims. The next three swimmers-Joe Verdeur who came in 2:16.3, Alan Ford in 2;16.4 and George Hoogerhyde in 2:17.4 were not used in any capacity in the 4x200 freestyle relay.

Rogers did not receive a medal, however, because under the Olympic swimming rules in effect in 1948, only those relay swimmers who competed in the event final were medal-eligible. He was inducted into The Columbia University Athletics Hall of Fame. He died in 2017 at the age of 93.

See also
 List of Columbia University alumni

References

1924 births
2017 deaths
American male freestyle swimmers
Columbia Lions men's swimmers
Olympic swimmers of the United States
Sportspeople from New York City
Swimmers at the 1948 Summer Olympics